is a private university in Takizawa, Iwate, Japan. Established in 1981, the predecessor of the school was founded in 1950 as a specialty school.

In April 1990, it was renamed Morioka Daigaku Junior College.

Curriculum
Department of Society and Culture 
Department of Nutritional Sciences 
Department of English and American Literature 
Department of Japanese Literature
Department of Child Education

References

External links
  
 English page

Educational institutions established in 1981
Christian universities and colleges in Japan
Private universities and colleges in Japan
Universities and colleges in Iwate Prefecture
1981 establishments in Japan
Takizawa, Iwate